Treich is name of:

 Marcel Treich-Laplène (1860–1890), first explorer of Côte d'Ivoire and its first colonial administrator
  (1889–1973)

 Place name
 Treichville, name comes from Marcel Treich-Laplène

German-language surnames
French families